Jacob Bunka (13 July 1923 – 30 July 2014) was a Jewish sculptor, known as the last Jew of Plungė who carved large monumental wooden statues at Holocaust sites in Lithuania.

Early life 
Bunka war born in Plungė in 1923 to a Jewish family, half the town being Jewish in the interwar period. In 1939 Bunka and his family were deported to Siberia.

World War II 
In 1942, Bunka was drafted with his father and brother to the 16th Lithuanian Division (Soviet). Bunka and his father were wounded in battle and recuperated in Zlatoust Hospita. Sent to the Belorussian front, Bunka was attached to the 1452nd Self-propelled Artillery Regiment. He was subsequently attached to the 10th Don Cossack regiment, serving in an intelligence role due to his German language skills. Bunka served in the Battle of Berlin. Bunka's father and brother died in service, while his mother and three sisters survived in Siberia. Following the end of the war Bunka served until 1947 in the Soviet occupation zone in the village of Ahrenshoop. Bunka was decorated with several medals during his service.

Post war 
Bunka returned to Plungė, where following the war there were 138 Jews. In 1950 he married his wife Dalija, a Lithuanian, whom he knew from his childhood. Together they raised three kids, one passing away. The surviving Jewish population of Plungė emigrated over the years, including Bunka's mother and sisters who emigrated to Israel, until he remained as the last Jew of Plunge.

Bunka was awarded the Knight's cross of the Order of the Lithuanian Grand Duke Gediminas by Lithuanian president Valdas Adamkus. The 1995 "Moses in Plateliai" documentary by Rimantas Gruodis is about his life.

Bunka died in 2014, prime minister Algirdas Butkevičius expressed his condolences.

Art and memorial sites 

In 1986, Bunka initiated the creation of a memorial for the Plungė massacre near the village of Kaušėnai. In 2007, the Jakovas Bunka Charity was setup to care for the site. He wrote a memorial yizkor book for Plungė.

Bunka created memorials in at least 10 different mass murder sites in Lithuania, his large wooden sculptures towering above the scene. In addition, Bunka crafted small wooden figurines of figures from the lost Jewish community.

Bunka was unique in that he created Jewish imagery in traditional Lithuanian wood craving. According to Jonas Rudzinskas, chairman of the Union of Lithuanian Folk Artists, " His responsible, sincere attitude towards creative work and unique style set Jakov Bunka apart from others and he joins the ranks of our greatest folk artists who set the development of folk art."

Exhibits 
In 2018, Bunka's work was displayed at Lithuanian National UNESCO Commission gallery, to the 95th anniversary of his birth.

References

External links
 Plungyan: A Memoir (Plunge), Yizkor book by Jacob Yosef Bunka
 Memorial of victims of the Holocaust in Kaušėnai, visitplunge.com
 Jakovas Bunka Charity and Sponsorship Fund
 Interview with Yankl Bunk (Jacob Bunka) of Plungyan

1923 births
2014 deaths
Lithuanian Jews
Lithuanian sculptors
Knight's Crosses of the Order of the Lithuanian Grand Duke Gediminas
People from Plungė